Nikolai Alexandrovich Morozov (Russian: Никола́й Алекса́ндрович Моро́зов; 7 July 1854, Borok – 30 July 1946) was a Russian revolutionary who spent about 25 years in prison for revolutionary activities against the Tsarist government. He was also an academic, publishing works in various fields of science and history, and a pioneer of aviation in Russia. At age 88, he briefly served in the Red Army as a sniper during World War II, becoming the oldest known combatant of the war.

Early life and revolutionary activities 

The son of a wealthy landowner and a serf woman who was bonded to his estate, Morozov was born in the village of Borok in the Governorate of Yaroslavl. He was initially educated at home before he started studying at the Second Moscow Gymnasium in 1869. He disliked the curriculum, especially Latin and divine law. He founded an informal self-education circle in natural science. He also attended lectures at Moscow University disguised in a student's uniform. He was expelled from school for distributing a science journal that had not been approved by the censorship division. Showing an early interest in politics, he was on a police watchlist as a student. He joined the Circle of Tchaikovsky and was active in distributing propaganda among peasants in the Moscow, Voronezh, and Kursk governorates before police persecution forced him to return to Moscow. He moved to St. Petersburg before departing for Geneva in 1874.

In 1875, he returned to Russia and was arrested at the border but released after his father paid his bail. He again devoted himself to revolutionary activities, distributing propaganda among the peasants of Saratov governorate.

In 1878, having returned to St. Petersburg, Morozov was a member of Zemlya i volya or Land and Liberty group where he co-edited their mouthpiece, Land and Liberty, (with Sergei Kravchinsky). When the group faced an internal crisis over tactics, it split into two groups in August 1879. Morozov rejected the continued use of propaganda to bring about social change and, instead, advocated for use of direct action. He joined the more radical of the two factions, Narodnaya Volya, or People's Will, eventually becoming one of its leaders.

In 1880, Olga Lyubatovich and Morozov left Narodnaya Volya and went to live in Geneva and London, where he was introduced to Karl Marx. While in exile, Morozov wrote The Terrorist Struggle, a pamphlet that explained his views on how to achieve a democratic society in Russia. He advocated for large numbers of small, independent terrorist groups and argued that this approach would make it difficult for the Tsarist secret police to apprehend the terrorists. This would also help to prevent a small group of leaders gaining power, forming oligarchical dictatorships after the overthrow of the Tsar.

Morozov returned to Russia in order to distribute The Terrorist Struggle on January 28, 1881, but was arrested at the border. He was imprisoned in Suwałki. Lyubatovich, having only just gone through childbirth, decided to attempt to rescue Morozov. However, her plan did not go well, and she was arrested and sent to Siberia in November 1882.

Later life and ideas 

Between 1882 and 1905, Morozov was imprisoned in Peter and Paul Fortress and in Shlisselburg Fortress for his political activities. During this period, he wrote political verse and began intense studies in the fields of physics, chemistry, astronomy, and history. After receiving permission to use theological literature, he learned Hebrew and began an in-depth study of Biblical history. After his release in 1905, he taught chemistry and astronomy at the University of St. Petersburg. In 1907, he was elected into the Duma, but as a former prisoner he was not allowed to take office. He became a member of many scientific associations, including the Russian Aero-club. For the publication of his book Songs of the Stars in 1910, he was imprisoned for another year.

Many of his ideas were considered unorthodox and daring. He conjectured that atoms have a complicated level structure and may be transformed. In his treatise on the periodic table, Morozov predicted the discovery of inert elements.

In 1907, Morozov published "The Revelation in Storm and Thunder" in which he produced evidence for his hypotheses:
 The Revelation to John can be dated astronomically to 30 September 395.
 The author of the Revelation is identical with John Chrysostom.

Morozov became a pioneer of aeronautics in Russia in the 1910s. He flew airplanes and balloons, including over the Shlisselburg Fortress where he had been imprisoned, and lectured at an aviation school. He proposed a parachute system which would automatically open and special suits for high-altitude flights. During World War I, Morozov went to the front in 1915 as a delegate of the All-Russian Zemstvo Union to aid the sick and wounded.

After the October Revolution, Morozov took little interest in politics and never joined the Communist Party. However, he was still appointed by Anatoly Lunacharsky to run the P. S. Lesgaft Institute of Natural Sciences in Petrograd (Leningrad), a position which he kept until his death at the age of 92. Based on the astronomical records such as the Almagest, he speculated that much of human history has been falsified. His theories about the chronology of the Middle East and Israel before the first century BCE later attracted the attention of Anatoly Fomenko, who based his own New Chronology upon them.

In his declining years, Morozov established a laboratory in his native Borok, north of Uglich, to monitor and study "inland waters". In 1932 he was named an Honorary Member of the Soviet Academy of Sciences. 

In 1942, Morozov, then aged 88, enlisted in the Red Army to fight in World War II. He had taken a sniper course in 1939 and claimed to be working on a new telescopic sight which needed to be field tested, threatening that if he was not allowed to enlist he would ask Joseph Stalin himself to intervene. The military leadership gave in and enlisted him. In December 1942, he was assigned to a battalion in the Volkhov area during the Siege of Leningrad as a sniper. He shot accurately despite needing glasses and, in one instance, spent half a day lying in ambush in the snow before killing a German officer. He used his academic training to enhance his effectiveness as a sniper, studying the trajectory of his bullets and making adjustments for humidity and wind. After a month he was pulled from the front line despite his protests. He unsuccessfully demanded to be returned to the front several months later. He was awarded the Medal "For the Defence of Leningrad" and the Order of Lenin in 1944.

Morozov died on 30 July, 1946 at the age of 92.

His memorial house in Borok is open to the public with his gravesite being close by. The asteroid 1210 Morosovia is named in his honor.

Notes

References
Morozow, Great Soviet Encyclopedia, 3rd Ed., vol. 16, Moscow, 1974, cols. 1727–1728.
Nikolai A. Morosow: "The Revelation in Storm and Thunder. History of the Apocalypses origin." (Откровение в грозе и буре. История возникновения Апокалипсиса. СПб.: Былое, 1907.) 
Biography of Morozov at Spartacus Educational
Michael S. Kissell, "The Revelation in Storm and Thunder", Popular Astronomy, 48 (1940), 537-549 & 49 (1941), 13-24 - gives a summary of Morozov's 1905 astronomical dating of the Book of Revelation.
N.T. Bobrovnikoff, "Pseudo-Science and Revelation", Popular Astronomy, 49 (1941), 251-257 - gives a critique of Morozov's dating of the Book of Revelation.

1854 births
1946 deaths
People from Yaroslavl Oblast
20th-century Russian scientists
Narodnaya Volya
Narodniks
Russian Constitutional Democratic Party members
Honorary Members of the USSR Academy of Sciences
Prisoners of Shlisselburg fortress
Prisoners of the Peter and Paul Fortress